Sir Kenneth James Morris,  (22 October 1903 – 1 June 1978) was an Australian politician who served as Deputy Premier of Queensland from 1957 to 1962.

Early life
Born in Brisbane, he was educated at Brisbane Grammar School before becoming the director of his family's boot manufacturing firm. In 1931, he married Ettie Louise Dunlop.

Morris served in the military 1939–1944, in Britain (1940), Tobruk (1941) and Egypt (1942); rising to the rank of Major.

Political career
A founding member of the Liberal Party in Queensland, he was elected to the Legislative Assembly of Queensland in 1944 as the member for Enoggera, transferring to Mount Coot-tha in 1950. Morris was state Leader of the Liberal Party 1954–1962, Deputy Premier 1957–1962, and Minister for Labour and Industry 1957–1962.

He stepped down as leader in August 1962 and as Deputy Premier in September due to health reasons, and moved to Cooktown where he cultivated legume seed. In December 1963, he won a special election for a Senate seat in Queensland, filling the vacancy caused by the death of Labor Senator Max Poulter and to which George Whiteside had been appointed. Morris defeated Whiteside 50.6% to 49.4%. He retired in 1967.

Personal life
Morris died in 1978 at Chermside, Brisbane.

References

Liberal Party of Australia members of the Parliament of Australia
Members of the Australian Senate for Queensland
Members of the Australian Senate
1903 births
1978 deaths
Australian Knights Commander of the Order of the British Empire
Australian politicians awarded knighthoods
Australian Companions of the Order of St Michael and St George
Deputy Premiers of Queensland
Liberal Party of Australia members of the Parliament of Queensland
20th-century Australian politicians